= Yatragenie =

Online bus ticketing website

- Website type: Private
- Founder: Renil Komitla
- Website: yatra.com
- Launched: 2013

Yatragenie is an Indian online bus ticketing website, based in Bangalore, and operating in other major cities. It claims to have 50,000 unique visitors a day and has a current revenue run rate of Rs 60 crore, is expecting to clock revenues of Rs 150 crore in the financial year 2015–16. Yatragenie is also a government-licensed radio taxi/cabs operators and has launched its services across all the districts of Andhra Pradesh and Telangana, and is one of the largest taxi-service providers in the respective states. yatragenie.com started operations in 2013, headed by Mr.Renil Komitla.
